Dora Gerson (born Dorothea Gerson; 23 March 1899 – 14 February 1943) was a German cabaret singer and stage and motion picture actress of the silent film era.

Life and career
Born Dorothea Gerson into a Jewish family in Berlin, Gerson began her career as a touring singer and actress in the Holtorf Tournee Truppe alongside actors Mathias Wieman and Ruth Hellberg in Germany where she met and married her first husband, film director Veit Harlan. The couple married in 1922 and divorced in 1924. Harlan would later direct the anti-Semitic Nazi propaganda film Jud Süß (1940), supposedly at the insistence of Nazi Propaganda Minister Joseph Goebbels.

In 1920, Gerson was cast to appear in the film Auf den Trümmern des Paradieses (On the Brink of Paradise), an adaptation of the Karl May-penned novel Von Bagdad nach Stambul, and later followed that same year in another May adaptation titled Die Todeskarawane (Caravan of Death). Both films included Hungarian actor Béla Lugosi in the cast and are now believed to be lost films. Gerson continued to perform as a popular cabaret singer throughout the 1920s as well as acting in films.

By 1933, when the Nazi Party came to power in Germany, the German-Jewish population was systematically stripped of rights and Gerson's career slowed dramatically. Blacklisted from performing in "Aryan" films, Gerson began recording music for a small Jewish record company. She also began recording in the Yiddish language during this time and the 1936 song "Der Rebe Hot Geheysn Freylekh Zayn" became highly regarded by the Jews of Europe in the 1930s. Gerson's most memorable recordings from this era were the German-language songs "Backbord und Steuerbord" and "Vorbei" (Beyond Recall), which was an emotional ballad, memorializing pre-Nazi Germany: 

In 1936, Gerson relocated with relatives to the Netherlands, fleeing Nazi persecution. She had married a second time to Max Sluizer (b. 24 June 1906). In 1938, she dubbed the voice of the Evil Queen in the German language film release of the 1937 American animated Walt Disney Productions film Snow White and the Seven Dwarfs for the German theatrical release in Amsterdam. However, the film was not shown publicly in Germany until 1951.

Death
On 10 May 1940, Germany invaded the Netherlands and the Jews there were subject to the same anti-Semitic laws and restrictions as in Germany. After several years of living under oppressive Nazi occupation, the Gerson family began to plan to escape. In 1942, Gerson and her family were seized trying to flee to Switzerland, a neutral nation in World War II Europe. The family were sent by railroad car to Drancy internment camp bound for the Nazi camp of Auschwitz in Nazi-occupied Poland. Dora, along with her husband and their two children, Miriam Sluizer (b. 19 November 1937) and Abel Juda Sluizer (b. 21 May 1940), were all killed at Auschwitz on 14 February 1943.

Filmography

References

External links
 
 Dora Gerson singing "Der Rebe Hot Geheysn Freylekh Zayn"
 Dora Gerson (with Sid Kay's Fellows) singing "Die Welt ist klein geworden" (1934)
 

1899 births
1943 deaths
20th-century German actresses
Actresses from Berlin
Cabaret singers
German cabaret performers
Jewish cabaret performers
People killed by gas chamber by Nazi Germany
German civilians killed in World War II
German film actresses
German silent film actresses
German stage actresses
Jewish German actresses
German people who died in Auschwitz concentration camp
Torch singers
Jewish singers
20th-century German women singers
German Jews who died in the Holocaust
Westerbork transit camp survivors